Mississippi Valley Conference may refer to:

Sports
Mississippi Valley Conference (Illinois), an Illinois-based high school athletic conference
Mississippi Valley Conference (Iowa), an Iowa-based high school athletic conference
Mississippi Valley Conference (Missouri), a Missouri-based high school athletic conference
Mississippi Valley Conference (Wisconsin), a Wisconsin-based high school athletic conference
Mississippi Valley Conference (college), an intercollegiate athletic conference based in Tennessee that existed from 1928 to 1934